Lee Dae-heon (born 17 November 1993) is a South Korean professional footballer.

Career

Sanfrecce Hiroshima
Born in Samcheok, Lee Dae-heon signed for Sanfrecce Hiroshima of the J1 League in January 2012. Lee Dae-Heon then made his professional debut for Hiroshima in the AFC Champions League on 13 March 2013 against Beijing Guoan at the Workers Stadium in Beijing. He came on as a 68th-minute substitute for Kohei Shimizu as Sanfrecce Hiroshima lost the match 2–1.

V-Varen Nagasaki (loan)
On 3 January 2014 it was announced that Lee Dae-heon had been loaned out to J2 League side V-Varen Nagasaki. He then made his debut for the club on 8 March 2014 against Shonan Bellmare. He came on as a 78th-minute substitute for Hiroshi Azuma as V-Varen Nagasaki lost the match 3–0.

Club statistics

References

External links

1993 births
Living people
South Korean footballers
Association football midfielders
Expatriate footballers in Japan
Sportspeople from Gangwon Province, South Korea
J1 League players
J2 League players
Sanfrecce Hiroshima players
V-Varen Nagasaki players
Tochigi SC players